Ryan-Segon Adigo (born 15 April 2001) is a Beninese professional footballer who plays as a right winger or right back for Regionalliga Nord club Phönix Lübeck and the Benin national team.

Club career
On 7 September 2022, Adigo joined Regionalliga Nord club Phönix Lübeck after his former club Würzburger Kickers had suffered relegation from the 3. Liga.

International career
Born in Germany, Adigo is of Beninese descent. He was called up to the Benin national team for matches in June 2022.

References

External links
DFB

2001 births
Living people
Citizens of Benin through descent
Beninese footballers
Association football wingers
Association football fullbacks
Benin international footballers
Sportspeople from Lübeck
German footballers
VfB Lübeck players
Hamburger SV players
Borussia Mönchengladbach II players
Würzburger Kickers players
1. FC Phönix Lübeck players
3. Liga players
Regionalliga players
German people of Beninese descent
German sportspeople of African descent
Footballers from Schleswig-Holstein